Cyrus Beasley (born February 29, 1972) is an American rower. He competed in the men's single sculls event at the 1996 Summer Olympics.

References

External links
 

1972 births
Living people
American male rowers
Olympic rowers of the United States
Rowers at the 1996 Summer Olympics
Pan American Games medalists in rowing
Pan American Games silver medalists for the United States
Rowers at the 1995 Pan American Games